The 1982–83 Hamburger SV season was the 36th season in the club's history and the 20th consecutive season playing in the Bundesliga.

Season summary 
The 1982–83 campaign is considered as the greatest in the history of the club, as Hamburg finished first in the league on goal difference, after being level on points with local rivals Werder Bremen. It was the club's second straight league title and third overall. In May, HSV recorded its greatest ever success, winning the European Cup for the first time, after a 1–0 win over Italian champions Juventus in the final in Athens. This ended a spell of six straight years of English clubs winning the trophy.

The club also participated in this season's edition of the DFB-Pokal, where they were knocked out by Hertha BSC in the round of 16.

Under manager Ernst Happel, Hamburg would go on an unbeaten streak of 36 matches which began during the previous season, on 30 January 1982, and ended on 29 January 1983. The run remained a Bundesliga record until November 2013, when it was broken by Bayern Munich.

Hamburg would also equal the record of suffering no home losses in a 34-match Bundesliga season, a feat the club had also accomplished under Happel in the previous season.

Squad

Competitions

Overview

Bundesliga

League table

DFB Pokal

European Cup

By winning the Bundesliga in 1981–82, HSV qualified for Europe's premier club competition. Their campaign began with an all-German affair, as Hamburg faced the champions from the communist East, BFC Dynamo, in mid-September 1982. After the two sides had played to a 1–1 draw in East Berlin, HSV advanced with a 2–0 win at home in the Volksparkstadion. HSV then went on to beat Olympiacos, Dynamo Kyiv and Real Sociedad on their way to the final against Juventus in Athens. A single goal from Felix Magath eight minutes into the game was enough for Hamburg to claim the title as goalkeeper Uli Stein made a series of important saves in the second half. It was the sixth consecutive European Cup Final to finish with a 1–0 scoreline.

First round

Second round

Quarter-final

Semi-final

Final

References

Hamburger SV seasons
Hamburger
German football championship-winning seasons
UEFA Champions League-winning seasons